The Ararat Plain, called Iğdır Plain in Turkey, is one of the largest plains of the Armenian Highlands. It stretches west of the Sevan basin, at the foothills of the Gegham mountains. In the north, the plain borders on Mount Aragats, and Mount Ararat in the south.

It is divided into two sections by the Aras River, the northern part located in Armenia, and the southern part in Turkey. The Turkish part of the plain is an Important Bird Area.

Etymology
The Medieval Armenian historian Movses Khorenatsi recorded in his History of Armenia that the Ararat plain was named after King Ara the Handsome, the great-grandson of Amasya.

Climate
The Ararat plain and the Sevan basin experience abundant sunshine and are the sunniest areas in Armenia, receiving about 2,700 hours of sunshine a year. The shortest duration of sunshine is in mid-mountain areas of the forest zone (about 2,000 hours). In the foothills, there is rarely a sunless day between the months of June and October.

Agriculture

The Ararat plain makes up 4% of Armenia's total land area, and yet it yields 40% of Armenia's farm production. In Turkish part of the plain, apricot is widely produced on a 1,525 ha-area.

Archaeology
This area has been inhabited since the Neolithic or the Early Chalcolithic times.

At Aratashen, first pottery appears at the end of the fifth millennium BC, or before 4000 BC.

Gallery

Notes

References

Landforms of Armenia
Plains of Turkey
Important Bird Areas of Turkey
Mount Ararat